Privokzalny (masculine), Privokzalnaya (feminine), or Privokzalnoye (neuter) may refer to:
Privokzalny City District, a city district of Tula, Tula Oblast, Russia
Privokzalny (inhabited locality) (Privokzalnaya, Privokzalnoye), name of several inhabited localities in Russia